This is a list of presidential trips made by Boris Yeltsin during his presidency, which began with his appointment on July 10, 1991. He traveled to 50 countries internationally, in addition to many more trips made domestically.

First term as president

1991–1996

Second term as president

1996–1999

See also
List of international presidential trips made by Dmitry Medvedev
List of international presidential trips made by Vladimir Putin
List of international trips made by Mikhail Gorbachev

References

External links
 Travels of the Yeltsin Presidency in Yeltsin Center official website.

Lists of diplomatic trips
1990s politics-related lists
Lists of diplomatic visits by heads of state
Diplomatic visits by heads of government
Diplomatic visits from Russia
Articles containing video clips
International presidential trips
Diplomatic visits by heads of state
Yeltsin